The Dorset Estate is a post-war Modernist housing estate in Bethnal Green, London.

Design
The estate was designed by Skinner, Bailey & Lubetkin and completed in 1957. The same architects designed the nearby Sivill House, completed in 1962.

The estate includes two Y-shaped 11-storey blocks, George Loveless House and James Hammett House, and the lower-rise James Brine House, Robert Owen House and Arthur Wade House. The blocks are named after the Tolpuddle Martyrs.

Altogether there are 266 homes on the estate.

References

Housing estates in the London Borough of Tower Hamlets
Bethnal Green